Gingival fibromatosis with hypertrichosis is a cutaneous condition characterized by dark terminal hairs on the peripheral face, central back, and extremities.  It is a RASopathy.

See also 
 Cantú syndrome
 List of cutaneous conditions

References 

Genodermatoses
RASopathies